All We Are is the second studio album by Irish acoustic hip-hop group O.R.B. released on iTunes on May 2, 2014  through Gotta Run Records. It entered the Independent Album Charts at number one and the first single, "Never Gonna Walk Away", won "Song of the Year" at the Meteor Choice Music Awards.

On November 21, 2014, a deluxe edition was released on iTunes

Track listing

Chart positions

References 

2014 albums
O.R.B. (band) albums
Rubyworks Records albums
Albums produced by Jake Gosling